Chatichai Choonhavan (5 April 1920 – 6 May 1998) was a Thai army officer, diplomat and politician. From 1986 to 1991, he was the chairman of the Thai Nation Party and served as the Prime Minister of Thailand from August 1988 until the coup d'état of February 1991.

Family
Chatichai was the only son of Field Marshal Phin Choonhavan and Khunying Wibunlak Choonhavan. He was of Thai Chinese descent with ancestry from Chenghai District of Shantou City, Guangdong Province, China. His father was the Commander-in-Chief of the Royal Thai Army from 1948 to 1954 and exerted a strong influence on the country's politics and economy. Chatichai had four sisters. The eldest was married to General Phao Siyanon, who was one of Thailand's strongmen during the 1950s. Another sister married Pramarn Adireksarn, who later became Chatichai's political ally. Chatichai married Boonruen Sopoj, a relative and confidante of Princess Mother Srinagarindrathe mother of kings Ananda Mahidol and Bhumibol Adulyadej.

Chatichai and Boonruen had two children, daughter Wanee Hongpraphas, and their son political scientist, social activist, and former senator Kraisak Choonhavan.

The former deputy prime minister Korn Dapparansi is his nephew.

Education, military and diplomatic career
Chatichai studied at Debsirin School, a long-standing, prestigious, all-boys school in Bangkok, and at the Chulachomklao Royal Military Academy. He entered active military service as second lieutenant and cavalry platoon leader in 1940. During World War II, he was assigned to the Phayap Army ("Northwest Army"), under the command of his father Phin, and participated in the invasion of the Shan States of Burma. After the war, he continued his training at the Thai Army Cavalry School and the United States Army Armor School in Fort Knox, Kentucky. In 1949, he was appointed military attaché in Washington, DC. At the age of 31, Chatichai was a major-general.

In 1951, the military, led by Chatichai's father and his brother-in-law, Phao Siyanon, effectively assumed power in Thailand in a "silent coup". They used their political influence to extend their activities to the economic sphere. Chatichai served in the Korean War as the commander of the 1st Cavalry Battalion. Then, he became director and commander of the Thai Army Armor School. In 1957, Field Marshal Sarit Thanarata rival of Chatichai's father and brother-in-lawstaged a coup d'état against the government of Prime Minister Plaek Phibunsongkhram. He ousted the Phin-Phao clique and filled the important political and military posts with his own followers. The new regime accused the Choonhavan clan (also known as the Soi Rajakru clan, after the family's residence) of having embezzled millions of dollars of public funds and hiding them in Swiss bank accounts. This ended Chatichai's military career.

Chatichai was transferred to the diplomatic service and assigned to the relatively unimportant post of ambassador to Argentina. During the following years he consecutively served as the Thai ambassador to Austria, Switzerland, Turkey, Yugoslavia, the Holy See and the United Nations. In 1972, he returned to Bangkok to become the director of the Foreign Ministry's political department.

Political career

In the government of Field Marshal Thanom Kittikachorn, Chatichai was appointed deputy minister of foreign affairs in 1972. During the hostage-taking in the Israeli embassy by a terrorist commando of the Palestinian Black September organisation in December 1972, he and the Agriculture Minister Dawee Chullasapya negotiated with the terrorists. In exchange for the release of the Israeli diplomats, they lent themselves as guarantees and accompanied the terrorists on their freedom flight to Cairo. Chatichai continued as deputy foreign minister after the 1973 democratic uprising, serving in the interim cabinet of Sanya Dharmasakti. In December 1973, one and a half years before Thailand officially established diplomatic relations with the People's Republic of China, Chatichai and Daweewho was then minister of defencewere the first Thai government officials to visit Beijing. There, they negotiated a contract for the supply of 50,000 tons of diesel oil at a "friendship price" and promised to remove trade barriers between the two nations.

In 1974, Chatichai and his in-laws Pramarn Adireksarn and Siri Siriyothinalso major generalsfounded the conservative and aggressively anti-communist Thai Nation Party (Chart Thai). It ran in the January 1975 general election, the first democratic election after the end of military dictatorship, and became the third-strongest party. Chatichai was elected member of parliament, representing a constituency in Nakhon Ratchasima Province. The Thai Nation Party joined a government coalition under Kukrit Pramoj. Chatichai served as minister of foreign affairs from 17 March 1975 to 21 April 1976. After the snap election in April 1976, in which the Thai Nation Party expanded its share of seats significantly, he was minister of industry in the government of Seni Pramoj until it was overthrown by a military coup d'état after the Thammasat University massacre of 6 October 1976. From 1980 to 1983, Chatichai served as industry minister under Prime Minister Prem Tinsulanonda. After three years of opposition, the party returned to government and Chatichai was deputy prime minister under Prem.

Premiership

The Thai Nation Party won the most votes in the 1988 Thai general election, resulting in Chatichai being appointed prime minister on 4 August 1988. This made him the first democratically elected head of government after 12 years of dictatorship and "semi-democracy". His government improved relations with communist-ruled Vietnam, Cambodia, and Laos, which had been Thailand's enemies during the Cold War. It promoted international trade with these countries and others. Chatichai's slogan was to turn Indochina "from a battlefield into a marketplace". It also supported the Sihanouk-led Government of Cambodia. Chatichai's government initiated many infrastructure projects, including an expansion of the telecommunications network in partnership with the state-owned Telephone Organization of Thailand (TOT), development of the Eastern Seaboard of Thailand, and road and rail networks in partnership with the Mass Rapid Transit Authority (MRTA) in the Greater Bangkok Area. During Chatichai's premiership, Thailand's economy saw annual growth rates of up to 13 percent.

Under Chatichai's government, there was rampant corruption. The parties and politicians in Chatichai's coalition scrambled overtly over the distribution of public funds. The Thai press dubbed them the "buffet cabinet", referring to their "take-what-you-like" mentality. Chatichai's standard answer whenever he was confronted by the press with difficulties or corruption allegations against members of his government was "no problem". A parody variant, "no plomplam", became the title of a popular song by folk rock singer Aed Carabao and entered Thai common parlance. Chatichai was heavily criticised when he tried to downplay the damage caused by Typhoon Gay, which resulted in 360 deaths, in the same way.

The formerly right-wing Thai Nation Party had de-ideologized itself and now represented the interests of the rising class of provincial businessmen. It pursued policies that boosted their businesses and involved them in lucrative government contracts. It advocated a reinforcement of the role of parliament, in which politicians from the provinces were strongly represented, in contrast with the unelected power elites in the administration and military which had made political decisions during the tenure of Chatichai's predecessor, Prem Tinsulanonda. Chatichai's government emphasised the economic development of the periphery at the expense of Bangkok's big businesses and military expenditures, which it tried to cut. These policies challenged the country's traditional elites.

Disempowerment and return
On 23 February 1991, the Commander-in-Chief of the Royal Thai Army, General Sunthorn Kongsompong, and the generals of the Chulalongkorn Military Academy class 5, Suchinda Kraprayoon, Issarapong Noonpakdi, and Kaset Rojananil, formed the National Peace Keeping Council to depose Chatichai's government in a coup d'état. They accused the elected government of massive corruption and abuse of power for its own advantage. They charged several cabinet members, including Chatichai, with "unusual wealth". At the same time, they acted in the interest of the traditional elite of the bureaucracy, military and Bangkokian business circles, whose influence the Chatichai government had sought to curtail. The coup group called the form of governance under Chatichai "parliamentary dictatorship" and alleged a moral decline.

Chatichai temporarily went into exile in the United Kingdom. After his return, he continued his political activity. After the 1992 Black May, he founded the National Development Party and was again elected in his constituency in Nakhon Ratchasima.

Personal life
Chatichai was known for his fondness of cigars, fine wines, and Harley-Davidson motorcycles. Even in old age, he practised several sports and visited parties and discothèques, earning him a reputation of being a playboy.

Death
On 6 May 1998, at the age of 78, Chatichai died from liver cancer in a hospital in London.

Honours
received the following royal decorations in the Honours System of Thailand:

  Knight Grand Cross of the Order of Chula Chom Klao
  Knight Grand Cordon of the Most Exalted Order of the White Elephant
  Knight Grand Cordon of the Most Noble Order of the Crown of Thailand
  Order of Ramkeerati
  Bravery Medal
  Victory Medal - Indochina
  Victory Medal - World War II 
  Victory Medal - Korean War
  Freemen Safeguarding Medal (First Class)
  Safeguarding the Constitution Medal
  Chakra Mala Medal
  King Rama IX Royal Cypher Medal,1st class

Foreign honours 
  : 
  Honorary Grand Commander of the Order of Loyalty to the Crown of Malaysia (1973)
 : 
 Grand Gwanghwa Medal of the Order of Diplomatic Service Merit, 1st Class
: 
 Grand Cross of the Order of the Liberator General San Martín
: 
 Grand Collar of the Order of Sikatuna
: 
 Grand Cordon of the Order of the Rising Sun
: 
 Commander Grand Cross of the Royal Order of the Polar Star

Military rank
 General, Admiral and Air Chief Marshal

Volunteer Defense Corps of Thailand rank
 Volunteer Defense Corps General

References

Chatichai Choonhavan
Chatichai Choonhavan
Chatichai Choonhavan
Chatichai Choonhavan
Chatichai Choonhavan
Chatichai Choonhavan
Chatichai Choonhavan
1920 births
1998 deaths
Chatichai Choonhavan
Chatichai Choonhavan
People from Chenghai
Chatichai Choonhavan
Chatichai Choonhavan
Chatichai Choonhavan
Leaders ousted by a coup
Chatichai Choonhavan
Chatichai Choonhavan
Chatichai Choonhavan
Chatichai Choonhavan
Chatichai Choonhavan
Honorary Grand Commanders of the Order of Loyalty to the Crown of Malaysia
Chatichai Choonhavan
Chatichai Choonhavan
Chatichai Choonhavan